The Timeservers is a novel by Russell M. Griffin, published in 1985 by Avon Books.  The tagline on the cover of the paperback is, "Too far from Earth time creates a different kind of human." It received a nomination for the Philip K. Dick Award for excellence in science fiction in 1985.  This novel is no longer in print.

References

1985 novels
1985 science fiction novels
Avon (publisher) books